Yamato 791197, official abbreviation Y-791197, is a meteorite that was found in Antarctica on November 20, 1979.

It is the first rock to be found on Earth identified as a lunar meteorite (see also ALH 81005). It was collected by National Institute of Polar Research, Japan.

Classification and characteristics
Weighing 52.4 grams, it is a weakly shocked feldspathic regolith breccia believed to have come from the lunar highlands on the far side of the Moon.

It is classified as lunar-anorthositic breccia, a lunar meteorite that is primarily anorthositic.

See also
 Glossary of meteoritics
 List of lunar meteorites

References

External links
 Chemical Classification

Meteorites found in Antarctica
Lunar meteorites